The Cabinet of Qatar is the chief executive body of the State of Qatar. The number of the cabinet ministers in 2007 was 13.

The Amir Sheikh Tamim bin Hamad Al Thani, on 19 October 2021 issued Amiri Order No. (4) of 2021 to reshuffle the Cabinet.

References

Qatar
Government of Qatar